Proletarian literature refers here to the literature created by left-wing writers mainly for the class-conscious proletariat. Though the Encyclopædia Britannica states that because it "is essentially an intended device of revolution", it is therefore often published by the Communist Party or left wing sympathizers, the proletarian novel has also been categorized without any emphasis on revolution, as a novel "about the working classes and working-class life; perhaps with the intention of making propaganda". This different emphasis may reflect a difference between Russian, American and other traditions of working-class writing, with that of Britain. The British tradition was not especially inspired by the Communist Party, but had its roots in the Chartist movement, and socialism, amongst others.<ref>Ian Hayward, Working-Class Fiction: from Chartism to Trainspotting. (London: Northcote House, 1997), pp. 1-3</ref> Furthermore, writing about the British working-class writers, H Gustav Klaus, in The Socialist Novel: Towards the Recovery of a Tradition (1982) suggested that "the once current [term] 'proletarian' is, internationally, on the retreat, while the competing concepts of 'working-class' and 'socialist' continue to command about equal adherence".

The word proletarian is also used to describe works about the working class by working-class authors, to distinguish them from works by middle-class authors such as Charles Dickens (Hard Times), John Steinbeck (The Grapes of Wrath), and Henry Green (Living). Similarly, though some of poet William Blake's (1757–1827) works are early examples of working-class literature, including the two "The Chimney Sweeper" poems, published in Songs of Innocence in 1789 and Songs of Experience in 1794, which deal with the subject of child labour, Blake, whose father was a tradesman, was not a proletarian writer.

Proletarian novel
The proletariat are members of the working class. The proletarian novel is a subgenre of the novel, written by workers mainly for other workers. It overlaps and sometimes is synonymous with the working-class novel, socialist novel, social problem novel (also problem novel or sociological novel or social novel), propaganda or thesis novel, and socialist realism novel.

The proletarian novel may comment on political events, systems and theories, and is frequently seen as an instrument to promote social reform or political revolution among the working classes. Proletarian literature is created especially by communist, socialist, and anarchist authors. It is about the lives of poor, and the period 1930 to 1945 in particular produced many such novels. However, there were works before and after these dates. In Britain the term working class literature, novel etc. is more generally used. The intention of the writers of proletarian literature is to lift the workers from the slums, by inspiring them to embrace the possibilities of social change or a political revolution.
By country
Australia

Australian authors who have contributed to proletarian literature have typically been affiliated with the Communist Party of Australia; Australian Labor Party or Australian Greens. Some prominent proletarian fiction authors include Frank Hardy (Power Without Glory) and David Ireland (The Unknown Industrial Prisoner about factory workers in Western Sydney).
France
Two leading French writers who were born into the working class were Jean Giono (1895–1970) and Henry Poulaille (1896–1980).

Jean Giono was the son of a cobbler and a laundry woman, who spent most of his life in Manosque, Alpes-de-Haute-Provence. He was a voracious reader but had to leave school at sixteen to work in a bank to help support his family. He published his first novel Colline in 1929, which won him the Prix Brentano and $1000, and an English translation of the book, he left the bank in 1930 to devote himself to writing on a full-time basis.

The novels Giono published during the nineteen-thirties are set in Provence, with peasants as protagonists, and displaying a pantheistic view of nature. Marcel Pagnol based three of his films on Giono's work of this period: Regain, with Fernandel and music by Honegger, Angèle, and La Femme du boulanger, with Raimu.

After World War II he planned on writing a sequence of ten novels inspired by Balzac’s La Comédie humaine, in which he would depict characters from all strata of society rather than peasants, and contrast different moments in history by depicting the experiences of members of the same family a hundred years apart. But Giono only completed the four Hussard novels, Mort d’un personnage (1948)), Le Hussard sur le Toit (1951), Le Bonheur fou (1957), Angelo (1958).

Henry Poulaille was the son of a carpenter and cane worker, who was orphaned at fourteen. In addition to writing novels Poulaille was active in encouraging working class writing in France from the 1930s. He is the author of numerous novels, essays on the cinema, literature, and popular traditions. Amongst the novels that he wrote are autobiographical works: There were four (1925); Daily Bread (1931); The Wretched of the Earth (1935); Soldier of Pain (1937); The Survivors: Soldier of Pain 2 (1938); Alone in life to 14 years (published posthumously in 1980). In these novels, based on his own life, Poulaiile depicts a working-class family, the Magneux.
Great Britain
19th century

Poet John Clare (1793–1864) was an important early British working-class writer. Clare was the son of a farm labourer, and came to be known for his celebratory representations of the English countryside and his lamentation of its disruption. His poetry underwent a major re-evaluation in the late 20th century and he is now considered to be among the most important 19th-century poets. His biographer Jonathan Bate states that Clare was "the greatest labouring-class poet that England has ever produced. No one has ever written more powerfully of nature, of a rural childhood, and of the alienated and unstable self".

A mid-Victorian example of a working-class novel is chartist Thomas Martin Wheeler's Sunshine and Shadows, which was serialized in the Northern Star 1849–50. Another chartist writer was the shoemaker poet Thomas Cooper, who, while in prison for making an inflammatory speech, "followed in the footsteps of Bunyan and other radicals and wrote imaginatively about the themes of oppression and emancipation".

20th century
Walter Greenwood's Love on the Dole (1933) has been described as an "excellent example" of an English proletarian novel. It was written during the early 1930s as a response to the crisis of unemployment, which was being felt locally, nationally, and internationally. It is set in Hanky Park, the industrial slum in Salford where Greenwood was born and brought up. The story begins around the time of the General Strike of 1926, but its main action takes place in 1931.

Several working-class writers wrote about their experience of life in the merchant navy, including James Hanley, Jim Phelan, George Garrett, and John Sommerfield. Liverpool-Irish writer James Hanley wrote a number of works based on his experiences at sea as well as a member of a working-class seafaring family. An early example is the novella The Last Voyage (1931), in which stoker John Reilly, who is still working only because he lied about his age, now faces his last voyage. Although Reilly is in his mid-sixties he has a young family, who will have to live in future on his inadequate pension. In another sense this is Reilly's last voyage, because despairing of the future he throws himself into the ship's furnace: “Saw all his life illuminated in those flames. ‘Not much for us. Sweat, sweat. Pay off. Sign on. Sweat, sweat. Pay off. Finish. Ah, well!’”Last Voyage and Other Stories (London: Harvill Press, 1997, p. 43. Among other works by Hanley are Boy (1931) and The Furys (1935).

There were a number of Welsh writers who wrote works based on their experiences as coal miners, including novelist (and playwright) Jack Jones (1884–1970), B.L. Coombes (1893-1974), novelists Gwyn Thomas (1913–1981). Lewis Jones (1897–1939), and Gwyn Jones (1907–1999), and poet Idris Davies (1905–53). Jack Jones was a miner's son from Merthyr Tydfil who was himself a miner from the age of 12. He was active in the union movement and politics, starting with the Communist Party, but in the course of his life he was involved, to some degree, with all the major British parties. Amongst his novels of working-class life are Rhondda Roundabout (1935) and Bidden to the Feast (1938). Bert Coombes came from Herefordshire to Resolven in south Wales as a teenager, where he spent the rest of his life, working as a miner for 40 years. Among his works, the autobiographical These Poor Hands (Gollancz 1939) is the classic account of life as a miner in south Wales. The political development of a young miner is the subject of Cwmardy (1937), Lewis Jones's (1897–1939) largely autobiographical novel. Gwyn Thomas (1913–81) was also a coalminer's son from the Rhondda, but won a scholarship to Oxford and then became a schoolmaster. He wrote 11 novels as well as short stories, plays, and radio and television scripts, most of which focused on unemployment in the Rhondda Valley in the 1930s. Thomas's first accepted book was a collection of short stories, Where Did I Put My Pity: Folk-Tales From the Modern Welsh, which appeared in 1946. Another writer who escaped from his proletarian background was Gwyn Jones (1907–1999). He wrote about this world in novels and short stories, including Times Like These (1936) which explores the life of a working-class family during the 1926 miners' strike. The mining valleys produced a significant working-class poet in Idris Davies (1905–53), who worked as a coal miner before qualifying as a teacher. Davies was a Welsh speaker but wrote primarily in English. His works include a few poesm in Welsh. Gwalia Deserta (1938) is about the Great Depression, while the subject of The Angry Summer (1943) is the 1926 miners' strike. Ron Berry (1920-1997), son of Rhondda collier who worked underground himself, produced novels and short stories rooted in the Welsh working class. Rhys Davies, author of A Time To Laugh (1937), and Menna Gallie, author of Strike for a Kingdom (1959) and The Small Mine (1962), while not working class, also wrote about life in the mining valleys of South Wales. Novelist and poet Christopher Meredith (1954- ), the son of a steelworker and former coalminer and formerly a steelworker himself, writes out of Welsh working class experience, especially in his novel Shifts (1988), set in the 1970s against the decline of the steel industry, and in most of the short stories of Brief Lives (2018).

Harold Heslop, author of the novel The Earth Beneath (1946) was another coal miner, but from the north-east of England, as was Sid Chaplin, who wrote The Thin Seam (1949).

Both Alan Sillitoe, Saturday Night and Sunday Morning (1958) and Stan Barstow, A Kind of Loving (1960), were working class writers associated with the so-called Angry young men; they were also linked with Kitchen sink realism, a literary movement that used a style of social realism. This often depicted the domestic situations of working class Britons living in cramped rented accommodation and spending their off-hours drinking in grimy pubs, to explore social issues and political controversies. However, some of the writers also associated with these two movements, like John Osborne and John Braine, did not come from the working-class.

The following are some other important twentieth-century British working class novelists and novels: Robert Tressell, The Ragged-Trousered Philanthropists (1914); James C. Welsh, The Underworld (1920); Ethel Carnie Holdsworth, This Slavery (1925); Ellen Wilkinson, Clash (1929); Lionel Britton, Hunger and Love (1931); Lewis Grassic Gibbon A Scots Quair (trilogy, 1932-4); Barry Hines, A Kestrel for a Knave (1968); William McIlvanney, Docherty (1975); Pat Barker, Union Street (1982); James Kelman, The Busconductor Hines (1984); Irvine Welsh, Trainspotting (1993).

Edward Bond is an important working-class dramatist and his play Saved (1965) became one of the best known cause célèbres in 20th century British theatre history. Saved delves into the lives of a selection of South London working class youths suppressed – as Bond would see it – by a brutal economic system and unable to give their lives meaning, who drift eventually into barbarous mutual violence.
Ireland
Notable Irish proletarian writers of the early 20th century included Liam O’Flaherty and Seán O'Casey. Leslie Daiken, Charles Donnelly and Peadar O'Donnell are also well-known.

Modern working-class authors include Karl Parkinson, Kevin Barry and Roddy Doyle, .
Japan

The proletarian literature movement in Japan emerged from a trend in the latter half of the 1910s of literature about working conditions by authors who had experienced them, later called Taisho workers literature. Representative works from this period include Sukeo Miyajima's Miners (坑夫) and Karoku Miyachi's Tomizō the Vagrant (放浪者富蔵), as well as works dealing with military experiences which were also associated with the Taishō democracy, the emergence of which allowed for the development of proletarian literature in Japan. In 1921, Ōmi Komaki and Hirofumi Kaneko founded the literary magazine The Sowers (種蒔く人), which aimed to reform both the current literary scene and society. The Sowers attracted attention for recording tragedies that occurred in the wake of the 1923 Great Kantō earthquake.

In 1924, Literary Front (文芸戦線) magazine was launched by Hatsunosuke Hirabayashi and Suekichi Aono, becoming the main magazine of the Japanese proletarian literature movement. New writing such as Yoshiki Hayama's The Prostitute (淫売婦) and Denji Kuroshima's A Herd of Pigs (豚群) also began to appear in the magazine.

In 1928, the Japanese Proletarian Arts Federation (全日本無産者芸術連盟, Nippona Artista Proleta Federacio, known as NAPF) was founded, bringing together the Japan Proletarian Artists Union (日本プロレタリア芸術連盟), the Labor-Farmers Artists Union (労農芸術家連盟), and the Vanguard Artists Union (前衛芸術家同盟). NAPF was largely the responsibility of two up-and-coming writers called Takiji Kobayashi and Sunao Tokunaga, and the organization's newsletter Battleflag (戦旗, Senki) published many influential works such as Kobayashi's The Crab Cannery Ship (蟹工船) and March 15, 1928 (一九二八年三月十五日) and Tokunaga's A Street Without Sun (太陽のない街). Another important magazine was Reconstruction (改造) which published writings from Ryunosuke Akutagawa and Yuriko Miyamoto, who had just returned from the Soviet Union. Other more renowned publishers like Chūo Kōron (Central Review), Kaizō (Reconstruction), and Miyako Shinbun also published works by proletarian authors, even those who were members of the Communist party.

Author Korehito Kurehara traveled secretly to the Soviet Union in 1930 for the Profintern conference, and upon his return in 1931, he started agitating for the democratization of literary organizations. This sparked the drive to organize literary circles in factories and rural areas, creating a new source of readers and writers there.

In 1931, the NAPF became the Union of Japanese Proletarian Cultural Organizations (日本プロレタリア文化連盟, Federacio de Proletaj Kultur Organizoj Japanaj, also known as KOPF), incorporating other cultural organizations, such as musicians and filmmakers. KOPF produced various magazines including Working Woman (働く婦人)

The Japanese government cracked down harshly on proletarian authors, as the Japanese Communist Party had been outlawed since its founding in 1922. Though not all authors were associated with the party, the KOPF was, leading to mass arrests such as the March 15 incident. Some authors, such as Takiji Kobayashi were tortured to death by police, while others were forced to renounce their socialist beliefs.Kanikōsen (1929) is a short novel by Takiji Kobayashi (translated into English as The Cannery Boat (1933), The Factory Ship (1973) and The Crab Cannery Ship (2013)), which depicts the lives of Japanese crab fishermen. Told from a left-wing point of view, it is concerned with the hardships that the crew face and how they are exploited by the owners. The book has been made into a film and as manga.
Korea

The proletarian literature movement in Korea was initially driven by the annexation of Korea by Japan in 1910 and the state of conditions that followed within the country. Proletarian literature acted as a movement that attempted to unify Korea against the shift into imperialism and capitalism that was brought forth by colonial Japan and its government that occupied Korea from the point of annexation until the end of World War II in 1945. The Korean proletarian literature movement became most prominent in the late 1920s and early 1930s, with the formation of multiple social and cultural groups that created, discussed, and revolved around proletarian arts.

Works of Korean proletarian literature written before 1927 revolved around reconstructing and reforming social issues. One such example would be the short story "Starvation and Slaughter" ("Kia wa Saryuk", 1925) by author Ch'oe Sŏ-hae, which detailed problems like discrimination between the wealthy and the poor classes. After 1927, Korean proletarian literature started to revolve around ideas that involved intellectuals rather than focus on the struggles between the rich and poor. Examples of these works include The Peasant Cho˘ng To-ryong by Yi Ki-yo˘ng, A Transitional Period by Han So˘r-ya, Rat Fire by So˘hwa, and Hometown by Kohyang.

Cultural movements, especially those of left-wing politics, were fundamental in driving the proletarian genre and movement in Korea. Yŏmgunsa, meaning Torch of the Masses, was a group and movement formed in 1922 that was led by the writer Song Yŏng, and built on a focus towards literature pertaining to social issues and class politics. PASKYULA was a group that reacted to and discussed commonplace literature and art, with more of a focus on the cultural aspects of the materials. These groups were two largely important circles in the movement of unification that represented the mix of proletarian and bourgeois ideals that initially propelled the genre of proletarian literature in Japan-occupied Korea.

Leader of Yŏmgunsa, and a key author in KAPF's circle, Song Yŏng primarily wrote with the intention of forming a solidarity within Korea as well as with Japan through his writing. Two works, "Our Love" in 1929, and "Shift Change" in 1930 highlight Yŏng's ideology of unification within his writing, as well as the idea of moving away from cultural nostalgia and an idyllic past. In "Our Love", the process of industrialization and its resulting urban cities are portrayed as locales of potential opportunity rather than iniquitous environments, depicting a contrasting opinion to other works produced within KAPF. This is first shown through Yong-hee, a primary character within the story who eventually leaves the Korean countryside and travels to Tokyo, in pursuit of escaping her hometown's oppressive patriarchal culture and finding unity, independence, and equality in urban Japan's workforce. Set in Japan, "Shift Change" focuses more on the working class movement itself through a group of feuding Korean and Japanese workers. The resolution results in a reconciliation through combined effort, encouraging a combined effort from both the Japanese and Korean proletariat.

During the Proletarian Movement, there was an urge from Japanese colonialists to “convert” Koreans away from communism. This conversion system was called cho˘nhyang. Cho˘nhyang sparked numerous works from various authors such as The Mire by Han So˘r-ya, New Year’s Day by Yi Kiyo˘ng, A Prospect by Paek Ch’o˘l, Barley by Kim Nam-ch’o˘n, and Management by Kim Nam-ch’o˘n, all published between the years 1939 and 1940.
Romania
Panait Istrati (1884–1935), was a Romanian working class writer, the son of the laundress and of a Greek smuggler. He studied in primary school for six years in Baldovinești, after being held back twice. He then earned his living as an apprentice to a tavern-keeper, then as a pastry cook and peddler. In the meantime, he was a prolific reader.

Istrati's first attempts at writing date from around 1907 when he started sending pieces to the socialist periodicals in Romania, debuting with the article, Hotel Regina in România Muncitoare. Here, he later published his first short stories, Mântuitorul ("The Redeemer"), Calul lui Bălan ("Bălan's Horse"), Familia noastră ("Our Family"), 1 Mai ("May Day"). He also contributed pieces to other leftist newspapers such as Dimineața, Adevărul, and Viața Socială. In 1910, he was involved in organizing a strike in Brăila. He went to Bucharest, Istanbul, Cairo, Naples, Paris (1913–1914), and Switzerland, where he settled for a while, trying to cure his tuberculosis). Istrati's travels were marked by two successive unhappy marriages, a brief return to Romania in 1915 when he tried to earn his living as a pig farmer, and long periods of vagabondage. In 1923 Istrati's story Kyra Kyralina (or Chira Chiralina) was published with a preface by the famous French novelist Romaine Rolland. It became the first in his Adrien Zograffi literary cycle. Rolland was fascinated with Istrati's adventurous life, urging him to write more and publishing parts of his work in Clarté, the journal that Rolland and Henri Barbusse ran. The next major work by Istrati was the novel Codine.

Russia and the Soviet Union
An important movement In the first years of the Russian Revolution, Proletkult, was an effort to encourage literacy. This was something quite different from the later, traditional and realist proletarian novel of the Stalin years.

In the 1930s Socialist realism became the predominant trend in Russia. Maxim Gorky was declared the founder of socrealism, and his pre-revolutionary works about the Revolutionary proletariat (the novel Mother and the play Enemies) were declared the first Socrealist works. Gorky described the lives of people in the lowest strata and on the margins of society, revealing their hardships, humiliations, and brutalization. However, he did not come from a working-class family and neither did another prominent writer in the early years after the Russian Revolution of 1917, Alexander Ostrovsky.Revyakin< A.I. A.N. Ostrovsky. Life and Works. Moscow, 1949, p. 7.

However, Nikolay Ostrovsky is an important writer, of the early Soviet era, from a working-class family. His novel How the Steel Was Tempered (1932) has been among the most successful works of Russian literature, with tens of millions of copies printed in many languages around the world. The book is a fictionalized autobiography of Ostrovsky's life, who had a difficult working-class childhood and became a Komsomol member in July 1919 and went to the front as a volunteer. The novel's protagonist, Pavel Korchagin, represented the "young hero" of Russian literature: he is dedicated to his political causes, which help him to overcome his tragedies.

Leonid Leonov (1899 — 1994) was a Soviet novelist and playwright. His novel The Russian Forest (1953) was acclaimed by the authorities as a model Soviet book on World War II and received the Lenin Prize, but its implication that the Soviet regime had cut down "the symbol of Old Russian culture" caused some nervousness, and Nikita Khrushchev reminded the author that "not all trees are useful ... from time to time the forest must be thinned."
Sweden
In Sweden proletarian literature became known in the 1910s. Early pioneers were Dan Andersson and Martin Koch. Proletarian literature became widely known in the 1930s when a group of non-academic, self-taught writers like Ivar Lo-Johansson, Eyvind Johnson, Jan Fridegård and Harry Martinson appeared writing about the working-class, often from the perspective of a young man.

Swedish proletarian literature is perhaps most closely associated with Ivar Lo-Johansson, who wrote about the lives of statare in his acclaimed novel Godnatt, jord ("Goodnight, earth", 1933) and in many short stories, collected in the books Statarna (1936–1937) and Jordproletärerna ("Proletarians of the Earth", 1941). Jan Fridegård also wrote about the lives of statare and is best known for a series of autobiographical novels beginning with Jag Lars Hård ("I Lars Hård", 1935). His first novel En natt i juli ("A night in July", 1933) is about a strike among statare, and depicts statare in a much rawer way than Lo-Johansson. Eyvind Johnson and Harry Martinson both later went on to write about other subjects and are mostly associated with proletarian literature by their highly acclaimed and widely read autobiographical novels published in the 1930s. Moa Martinson wrote about her own experiences of poor farm life as a wife and mother in several novels. Rudolf Värnlund depicted life in Stockholm from a proletarian perspective in several novels, and in 1932 his play Den heliga familjen ("The holy family") was the first play by a proletarian writer that was staged at the national Swedish theatre Kungliga Dramatiska Teatern. Lars Ahlin debuted in 1944 with Tåbb med manifestet ("Tåbb with the manifest"), a novel about a young man looking for work and becoming politically aware. Many of the proletarian writers became prominent in Swedish literature. Eyvind Johnson and Harry Martinson were elected members of the Swedish Academy and shared the Nobel prize in literature in 1974.

Proletarian literature in Scandinavia is also represented by writers such as the dane Martin Andersen Nexø, Norwegian Johan Falkberget and Väinö Linna from Finland.

United States

The most important American working-class writers gathered in the First American Writers Congress of 1935. The League of American Writers was backed by the Communist Party USA. Among the famous international writers who attended the Congress were Georg Fink (pseudonym of the German writer Kurt Münzer), Mike Gold of New York (both of whom were Jewish), José Revueltas of Mexico, Nicomedes Guzmán of Chile, Jorge Icaza of Ecuador, and numerous others.

In the United States, Mike Gold, author of Jews Without Money, was the first to promote proletarian literature in Max Eastman's magazine The Liberator and later in The New Masses. The Communist party newspaper, The Daily Worker also published some literature, as did numerous other magazines, including The Anvil, edited by Jack Conroy, Blast, and Partisan Review.

Other examples of American proletarian writing include B. Traven, The Death Ship (1926) (though it is presumed that Traven was born in Germany); Agnes Smedley, Daughter of Earth (1929); Edward Dahlberg, Bottom Dogs (1929); Jack Conroy, The Disinherited (1933); James T. Farrell, Studs Lonigan (a trilogy, 1932-5); Robert Cantwell, The Land of Plenty (1934); Henry Roth, Call It Sleep (1934); Meridel Le Sueur, Salute to Spring (1940) and Tillie Olsen, Yonnondio (1930s, published 1974).

Writers like John Steinbeck, Theodore Dreiser, and John Dos Passos, who wrote about the working class, but who came from more well-to-do backgrounds, are not included here.

See also
 American proletarian poetry movement
 Bertolt Brecht
 Doris Lessing
Political cinema
 Political poetry
 Political drama
 Social criticism#In literature and music

References

Further reading
Anthologies
 The American Writer's Congress. edited by Henry Hart. International Publishers, New York 1935.
 Proletarian Literature in the United States: an Anthology. edited by Granville Hicks, Joseph North, Paul Peters, Isidor Schneider and Alan Calmer; with a critical introduction by Joseph Freeman. International Publishers, New York 1935.
 Proletarian Writers of the Thirties. edited by David Madden, Carbondale: Southern Illinois University Press, 1968

Studies
 Aaron, Daniel: Writers on the Left. Harcourt, New York 1961.
 Bowen-Stuyk, Heather & Norma Field. For Dignity, Justice, and Revolution: An Anthology of Japanese Proletarian Literature. University of Chicago Press, 2015.
 Brown, Edward James. Russian Literature Since the Revolution. London: Collier Books, 1965.
 Chapman, Rosemary. Henry Poulaille and Proletarian Literature 1920–1939. Amsterdam & Atlanta, GA: Rodopi, 1992.
 Coiner, Constance. Better Red: The Writing and Resistance of Tillie Olsen and Meridel Le Sueur. Oxford University Press, 2000.
 Del Valle Alcalá, Roberto. British Working-Class Fiction: Narratives of Refusal and the Struggle Against Work. London: Bloomsbury, 2016.
 Denning, Michael. The Cultural Front: The Laboring of American Culture in the Twentieth Century. Verso, 1996.
 Empson, William. "Proletarian Literature", in Some Versions of Pastoral, pp. 3–23. New York: New Directions Paperbacks, 1965.
 Ferrero, Mario. Nicomedes Guzmán y la Generación del 38. Santiago de Chile: Ediciones Mar Afuera, 1982.
 Foley, Barbara. Radical Representations: Politics and Form in U.S. Proletarian Fiction, 1929-1941 . Duke University Press, 1993.
 Fox, Pamela. Class Fictions: Shame and Resistance in the British Working Class Novel, 1890-1945. Duke University Press, 1994.
 Freeman, Joseph. Introduction to Proletarian Literature in the United States. Granville Hicks, et al., eds. New York: International Publishers, 1935.
 Hawthorn, Jeremy. The British Working Class Novel in the Twentieth Century. Hodder Arnold, 1984.
 Haywood, Ian. Working-Class Fiction: from Chartism to "Trainspotting". Plymouth: Nortcote House, 1997.
 Keating, Peter. The Working Classes in Victorian Fiction. London: Routledge, 1971.
 Klaus, H. Gustav (Ed). The Socialist Novel In Britain. Brighton: Harvester, 1982. 0-7108-0340-0.
 Klaus, H. Gustav. The Literature of Labour: Two Hundred Years of Working-Class Writing. Brighton: Harvester, 1985. .
 Klaus, H. Gustav (ed.). The Rise of Socialist Fiction 1880-1940. Brighton: Harvester, 1987.
 Klaus, H. Gustav & Stephen Knight (Eds). British Industrial Fictions. Cardiff: University of Wales Press, 2000. .
 Lukács, György. Studies in European Realism. New York: Grosset & Dunlap, 1964.
 Murphy, James F. The Proletarian Episode in Russian Literature, 1928-1932. Urbana, Ill.: University of Illinois Press 1991.
 Nekola, Charlotte & Rabinowitz, Paula (Eds). Writing Red: An Anthology of American Women Writers, 1930-1940. New York: The Feminist Press at The City University, 1988.
 Nelson, Cary. Revolutionary Memory: Recovering the Poetry of the American Left. Routledge, 2001.
 Park, Sunyoung. The Proletarian Wave: Literature and Leftist Culture in Colonial Korea, 1910-1945. Harvard University Press, 2015.
 Pearson, Lon. Nicomedes Guzman: Proletarian author in Chile's literary generation of 1938. Columbia: University of Missouri Press, 1964.
 Promis [Ojeda], José. La Novela Chilena del Ùltimo Siglo. Santiago: La Noria, 1993.
 Rabinowitz, Paula. Labor and Desire: Women's Revolutionary Fiction in Depression America. University of North Carolina Press, Chapel Hill 1991.
 Rideout, Walter B. The Radical Novel in the United States: 1900–1954. Harvard University Press, Cambridge, Mass. 1956.
 Sinyavsky, Andrei (Abram Tertz). On Socialist Realism. Introduction by Czeslaw Milosz. Trans. by George Dennis. New York: Pantheon Books, 1993.
 Smith, David. Socialist Propaganda in the Twentieth Century British Novel, Macmillan, 1978
 Steinberg, Mark. Proletarian Imagination: Self, Modernity, and the Sacred in Russia, 1910–1925. Ithaca: Cornell University Press, 2002. (On proletarian literature in late-imperial and early Soviet Russia)
 Vicinus, Martha. The Industrial Muse: A Study of Nineteenth-Century British Working-Class Literature. London: Croom Helm, 1974.
 Wald, Alan M. Writing from the Left. Verso, 1984.
 Wald, Alan M. Exiles from a Future Time. University of North Carolina Press, 2002.

Articles
 Eric Homberger, "Proletarian Literature and the John Reed Clubs, 1929–1935", Journal of American Studies, vol. 13, no. 2 (Aug. 1979), pp. 221–244. In JSTOR.
 Victor Serge and Anna Aschenbach, "Is Proletarian Literature Possible?" Yale French Studies, No. 39 (1967), pp. 137–145. In JSTOR.
 R.W. Steadman, "A Critique of Proletarian Literature", North American Review, vol. 247, no. 1 (Spring 1939), pp. 142–152. In JSTOR.

External links
List of Working Class Literature, www.rebelgraphics.org/
Ruth Barraclough talks about Factory Girl Literature in Korea at University of Minnesota, October, 2012

 
Academic works about politics
Marxist writers
Political art
Political literature
Proletariat